Doroh (also Romanized as Doroḩ, Doroḩ, Dorūh, and Durūh) is a village in Doreh Rural District, in the Central District of Sarbisheh County, South Khorasan Province, Iran. At the 2016 census, its population was 2431, in 655 families.

References 

Populated places in Sarbisheh County